The Rivière du Moulin (English: River of the mill) flows in the municipality of Saint-Laurent-de-l'Île-d'Orléans, in the L'Île-d'Orléans Regional County Municipality, in the administrative region of Capitale-Nationale, in the province of Quebec, in Canada.

The lower part of this small valley is served by Chemin Royale (route 368) which runs along the southeast shore of Île d'Orléans. Apart from the village area, near its mouth, agriculture is the main activity of this small valley.

The surface of the Moulin river is generally frozen from the beginning of December until the end of March; however, safe circulation on the ice is generally done from mid-December to mid-March. The water level of the river varies with the seasons and the precipitation; the spring flood occurs in March or April.

Geography 
The Moulin river takes its source at the limit of the forest and agricultural area, that is on the northwest side of the Coast at Gobeil, in Saint-Laurent-de-l'Île-d'Orléans.

  first towards the northeast first in the forest zone, then entering the agricultural zone and crossing a golf course, up to a bend of the river corresponding to a stream (coming from the north and draining six small lakes);
  to the south-east, then east, with a drop of  down the hill to Filion, and through the village of Saint- Laurent-d'Orléans, to its mouth.

The Moulin river flows at the bottom of Anse de l'Église, on the northwest bank of the Chenal des Grands Voiliers (which is crossed by the Saint-Laurent river) in Saint-Laurent-de-l'Île-d'Orléans. A marina is built on the point advancing south-east on the east side of the cove.

Toponymy 
The toponym "river of the Mill" originates from the existence of a mill which would have been erected in the XVIIth century undoubtedly in the lower part of its course.

The toponym "Rivière du Moulin" was formalized on February 11, 1971 at the Place Names Bank of the Commission de toponymie du Québec.

See also 

 Capitale-Nationale, an administrative region
 L'Île-d'Orléans Regional County Municipality
 Île d'Orléans, an island
 Saint-Laurent-de-l'Île-d'Orléans
 Chenal des Grands Voiliers
 St. Lawrence River
 List of rivers of Quebec

Notes and references 

Rivers of Capitale-Nationale
L'Île-d'Orléans Regional County Municipality